Martin Kyerematen was a Ghanaian politician in the first republic. He became the member of parliament (MP) for the Agona Kwabre constituency in 1961 when the then MP for the constituency, Victor Owusu was detained for allegedly plotting a coup to overthrow the then incumbent Nkrumah government. He served in this capacity until 1965 when he became the member of parliament for the Agona constituency. He represented the constituency in parliament from 1965 to 1966.

See also
 List of MPs elected in the 1965 Ghanaian parliamentary election

References

Date of birth missing
Date of death missing
Ghanaian MPs 1965–1966
Convention People's Party (Ghana) politicians
20th-century Ghanaian politicians